Olena Shumkina (born 24 January 1988 in Atyuryevsky District, Mordovia, Russian SFSR) is a Ukrainian race walker. She competed in the 20 km kilometres event at the 2012 Summer Olympics. She is married to race walker Oleksiy Kazanin.  She became a Ukrainian citizen in 2009.

References

External links

Ukrainian female racewalkers
1988 births
Living people
People from Mordovia
Olympic athletes of Ukraine
Athletes (track and field) at the 2012 Summer Olympics
World Athletics Championships athletes for Ukraine